David William Watson (March 10, 1940 - October 5, 2014) was a British American actor of film, television and theatre.

Watson was born in Austin, Texas. Subsequently, Watson's parents moved to London, where they had been brought up, and where Watson was then brought up.

On stage, Watson played many Shakespearean characters including that of Hamlet, Prince of Denmark in Hamlet, Romeo in Romeo and Juliet, Prospero in The Tempest and Macbeth in Macbeth.

After appearing on stage, Watson first moved onto television, appearing in episodes of TV shows such as Rawhide, Never Too Young, The Girl from U.N.C.L.E., The Time Tunnel, Petticoat Junction, Rowan & Martin's Laugh In, The Legend of Robin Hood, Walt Disney's Wonderful World of Color, Daniel Boone, Charlie's Angels, The Bionic Woman, Project U.F.O. and Good Guys Bad Guys.

He also appeared in the films Beneath the Planet of the Apes, Beyond the Next Mountain, Lucky Break (AKA Paperback Romance) and The Wannabes. He retired in 2003. He died of a heart attack in 2014.

Filmography

References

External links 

 Obituary - The Stage

1940 births
2014 deaths
Male actors from London
American male film actors
American male stage actors
American male television actors